Pseudobohlina is a genus of green algae in the class Trebouxiophyceae. , the only species was Pseudobohlina americana.

References

Trebouxiophyceae
Trebouxiophyceae genera
Monotypic algae genera